Michelle Handelman (born 1960) is an American video installation artist, filmmaker, photographer, performance artist, writer and professor. She is an associate professor at the Fashion Institute of Technology (FIT) and currently lives in Brooklyn.

Work
She received her M.F.A. in 2000 from Bard College and her B.F.A. in 1989 from the San Francisco Art Institute. She was an associate professor at the Massachusetts College of Art and Design from 2007–2013.

Handelman's 2009 four-channel video installation "Dorian, a cinematic perfume" is based on Oscar Wilde's The Picture of Dorian Gray. It features the bio-fem drag queen Sequinette as Dorian, Armen Ra as Lord Henry, K8 Hardy as Sybl, Quin Charity as Basil and Mother Flawless Sabrina as Dead Dorian. It features music by Lustmord, Armen Ra, Nadia Sirota, Vincent Baker, and Stefan Tcherepnin. "Dorian, a cinematic perfume" has been exhibited at Participant, Inc., NYC; MIT List Visual Arts Center, Cambridge; Arthouse at the Jones Center, Austin; Guangzhou 53 Art Museum, China; Dirty Looks Screening Series and Vox Populi gallery, Philadelphia.

Handelman created the live multimedia performance, The Laughing Lounge for PERFORMA 05 the first biennial of visual art performance. BloodSisters (1995) her feature documentary on the San Francisco leather dyke scene is distributed by the Tribeca Film Institute's Reframe Collection

Handelman's fiction can be found in Coming Up, the world's best erotica (Richard Kasak books, New York) Herotica 3 edited by Susie Bright (Down There Press, San Francisco) and her article, The "Media Conspiracy Against the Developing Mind", co-written with Monte Cazazza is published in Apocalypse Culture 2 (Feral House Press, Los Angeles)

Cannibal Garden was a series from 1998–2000 featuring series of video loops and photographs.

Her work has shown at Georges Pompidou Centre, Institute of Contemporary Arts, London; American Film Institute, San Francisco Museum of Modern Art (SFMoMA), Museum of Fine Arts, Boston, Museum of Contemporary Art, Chicago, MIT's List Visual Arts Center, and on PBS.

Filmography

Awards and honors
In 1999 Handelman won the Bravo Award (Bravo television) for BloodSisters. She is a 2011 Guggenheim Fellow and 2010 New York Foundation for the Arts Fellow. 

Her other recent accolades include a 2014 Art Matters Grant, a 2018 New York State Council on the Arts grant, and a 2018 San Francisco Museum for Modern Art (SFMOMA) Film and Performance Commission, all for her film project Hustlers & Empires. In 2019, she received a NYSCA/Wave Farm Media Arts Assistance Fund Grant and was a Creative Capital Awardee. She was an Artist-in-Residence at the Robert Rauschenberg Foundation on Captiva Island in 2020.

See also
 List of female film and television directors
 List of LGBT-related films directed by women

References

External links
Michelle Handelman's official website
signs and symbols gallery
Creative Capital awardee profile
Guggenheim Fellow profile

Living people
Massachusetts College of Art and Design faculty
Bard College alumni
San Francisco Art Institute alumni
1960 births
Fashion Institute of Technology faculty
People from Chicago
People from Brooklyn